Bunch of Hits is a greatest hits album by English group Bananarama, released on 13 March 1993 by Spectrum Music. It contains many of the same tracks found on the 1989 hits set Greatest Hits Collection.  Along with hits, several album tracks were included here. Curiously absent are Bananarama's two biggest singles, "Cruel Summer" and "Venus". It also included two B-sides available for the first time on CD, "Scarlett" and "Ghost". This album was not released by the group's record label London Records. The album was released with different artwork and titles in other countries, such as Pop Giants (1997, Germany), Collection Series (1997, Australia), Robert De Niro's Waiting (1999, Netherlands) and also saw a re-release with different artwork in the UK in 1998.

Track listing
 "Love in the First Degree" (Aitken, Dallin, Fahey, Stock) – 3:29
 "Bad for Me" (Aitken, Dallin, Fahey, Stock) – 3:36
 "I Heard a Rumour" (Aitken, Dallin, Fahey, Stock) – 3:25
 "Ain't No Cure" (Aitken, Dallin, Stock) – 3:24
 "I Can't Let You Go" (Caine, Dallin, Youth) – 6:11
 "Hooked on Love" (Dallin, Fahey, Jolley, Swain) – 3:48
 "Young at Heart" (Dallin, Fahey, Hodgens) – 3:10
 "Robert De Niro's Waiting..." (Dallin, Fahey, Jolley, Swain) – 3:30
 "Hot Line to Heaven" (Jolley, Swain) (album edit version) – 3:51
 "Dance with a Stranger" (Dallin, Fahey, Jolley, Swain) – 4:28
 "Scarlett" (Bishop, Dallin, Fahey, Seymour) – 4:13
 "Ghost" (Bishop, Dallin, Fahey, Seymour) – 4:05
 "Rough Justice" (Dallin, Fahey, Jolley, Swain) – 3:37
 "Cheers Then" (Dallin, Fahey, Martin, Sharpe) – 3:26

References

1993 greatest hits albums
Bananarama albums